The Commission for the Geological Map of the World (CGMW or CCGM) is an association and a standardization body in the field of geology and stratigraphy. Its main role is the production of small-scale maps of continents, oceans, regions of the Earth. It works in particular in collaboration with the International Commission on Stratigraphy to develop a geological time scale.

The CGMW is one of the oldest international organizations in earth sciences: It was created in 1881 during the second International Congress of Geology, of which it is in fact a commission. When the International Union of Geological Sciences was created, it joined to expand its cartographic work.

Its current president is Philippe Rossi. Its last general assembly was held in Cape Town, South Africa, from August 27 to September 4, 2016.

References

External links 
 CGMW official site
 CGMW catalogue of publications
 Philippe Bouysse, explanatory notes on Geological Map of the World, 3rd edition revised to scale of 1:35 000 000, July 2014
 Official color codes for the International Stratigraphy Chart, which are used by the geological range bars seen in some Wikipedia infoboxes.

Stratigraphy